Hylaeamys yunganus, also known as the Amazonian oryzomys or Yungas rice rat, is a species of rodent in the genus Hylaeamys of family Cricetidae. It is found in lowland tropical rainforest throughout Amazonia, in northeastern Bolivia, eastern Peru, eastern Ecuador, southeastern Colombia, southern Venezuela, Guyana, Suriname, French Guiana, and northern Brazil. A closely related species, Hylaeamys tatei, occurs only in a small area in eastern Ecuador. Both were previously placed in Oryzomys.

References

 

Hylaeamys
Rodents of South America
Mammals of Bolivia
Mammals of Brazil
Mammals of Colombia
Mammals of French Guiana
Mammals of Guyana
Mammals of Peru
Mammals of Suriname
Mammals of Venezuela
Mammals described in 1902
Taxa named by Oldfield Thomas